Asutosh College (Bengali: আশুতোষ কলেজ) is a college affiliated to the University of Calcutta, situated in Southern Kolkata, close to the Jatin Das Park Metro Station, gate No. 2. It was established in 1916 as the South Suburban College, under the stewardship of educationist Sir Ashutosh Mukherjee, who was the then vice-chancellor of the University of Calcutta. After the death of Sir Mukherjee, the college was renamed as Asutosh College in 1924. The principal of the college is Dr. Dipak Kumar Kar. It is affiliated to the University of Calcutta.

The first college in West Bengal to be accredited by the National Assessment and Accreditation Council in 2002, it was given an A grade with a CGPA score of 3.22 in 2016, helping it secure its position among the top four affiliated colleges of West Bengal.

History

The college shifted to its current location in 1935. The present college building has a premise of forty thousand square feet and more than fifty classrooms which can contain about 4000 students. Twenty-eight subjects are taught as Honors/Major/Vocational at the Undergraduate level.

In the year 2002, a post graduation course in Environmental Science was introduced. Post graduate courses in Applied Geology, Bengali, Computer Science, Information Science, Geography, Zoology were introduced in between 2009 and 2014. In 2013, add-on courses in Hospital waste disposal management, Industrial Chemistry and Travel & Tourism were introduced.

In 2012, the Mother Teresa International Award was conferred on Asutosh College for outstanding achievement and contribution in the field of Best College of the Year.

In 2014, University Grants Commission-approved free add-on courses on Tourism, Industrial Chemistry, and Hospital Waste Disposal Management were introduced by the college.

Campuses
A Second Campus of Asutosh College was planned in 2003.
The Centenary Building of the college was inaugurated by the erstwhile President of India, Pranab Mukherjee on 1 April 2015. Asutosh college is the 12th college in Kolkata that was first to set up rooftop solar plant to produce 20 kW for its own use.

Academics
The college is an institution of choice for many students in Kolkata and the wider state for subjects in the liberal arts and science. While the English, Bengali, History and Statistics departments of the college are staffed by some of the most senior academic faculty in the city, the upgradation of laboratory infrastructure has focused attention on the science stream in recent years. The Geography, Physics, Zoology, Microbiology and chemistry departments have remained special draws for under graduation students. The Mass Communication department and Communicative English Department has also seen applications rising.Each year the college has UDAAN celebration which has become quite popular for showcasing youth talent.

However, this has continued to exacerbate the major imbalance in student to teacher ratio, in Honours classes as well as those for Pass subjects. This problem had been pointed out by NAAC in its very first review of the college in 2004. "In the big urban colleges, like that of Asutosh, the teacher-taught ratio needs to be much more balanced. Universities and educational administrators of the state need to think of a way out of this huge imbalance in the classroom, as this may throw normal teaching-learning out of gear."

NAAC accreditation
In 2015, the Government of West Bengal offered a financial incentive of up to Rs. 2 crore each, to colleges with NAAC grading of A or B. The Department of Higher Education wanted institutions like Asutosh College with a proven academic track record of renewing their NAAC grade. But many colleges, including Asutosh, was reluctant to get involved in the process which the Principal at the time called "long drawn and fund consuming, without having any real benefit". While the college was rated C++ in its inaugural assessment back in 2002, it did not apply in 2007 when the rating expired. It has since applied for certification and now has an A grade rating by the NAAC.

Facilities
The college has a separate counselling cell for both victims of ragging as well as possible aggressors, as part of an anti-ragging initiative.

All the departments have their own libraries and well-organized laboratories for Science departments.

Controversies
In 1996, then Principal Subhankar Chakraborty was accused of moral policing after he asked female students to dress modestly.

In early 2018, sanitary pad dispensers, installed in the college back in 2015 were found to be not working. Many female students did not know about the machines while others felt self-conscious to use the machines which were placed in corridors and other public parts of the campus. However, the college alleged the quality of pads were so low that students gave them a miss. They also said the after sales service of the company roped in by the state government to install and operate the machines, were unpredictable and bad.

Notable alumni

 Bappaditya Bandopadhyay
 Dwaipayan Bharadwaj
Aniket Chattopadhaya
 Amitabha Chowdhury
 Usha Ranjan Ghatak
 Vina Mazumdar
 Diptendu Pramanick
 Arun Kumar Sharma
 P. C. Sorcar, Jr.
 Dhiraj Bhattacharya
 Amlan Datta

Politicians
 Ritabrata Banerjee
 Firhad Hakim
 Gurudas Dasgupta
 Abu Hasem Khan Choudhury
 Sovandeb Chattopadhyay
 Madan Mitra
 Partha Chatterjee
 Mimi Chakraborty
 Dipsita Dhar
 Geeta Mukherjee
 Shatarup Ghosh
 Kanai Chatterjee

Actors
 Tripti Mitra
 Rabi Ghosh
 Basabi Nandi
 Bijoya Ray
 Ranjit Mallick
 Rahul Banerjee
 Mimi Chakraborty
 Antara Biswas
 Michael Prince
 Ditipriya Roy

Authors & Poets
 Tarasankar Bandyopadhyay
 Mahasweta Devi
 Dinesh Das
 Kabita Sinha
 Srijato
 Tapan Bandyopadhyay

Singers
 Hemanta Kumar Mukhopadhyay
 Anjan Dutt
 Neel Dutt
 Nachiketa Chakraborty
 Anup Ghoshal
 Rupam Islam

Sports personalities
 Sunil Chetri
 Chuni Goswami
 Benu Dasgupta
 Syed Naeemuddin

See also 
 Jogamaya Devi College
 Syamaprasad College
 University of Calcutta

References

External links
 

University of Calcutta affiliates
Educational institutions established in 1916
Universities and colleges in Kolkata
1916 establishments in British India